The Animatrix: The Album is a 2003 soundtrack album from The Animatrix collection films.

Track listing 
 "Who Am I? (Animatrix Edit)" by Peace Orchestra
 "Big Wednesday" by Free*land
 "Blind Tiger" by Layo & Bushwacka!
 "Under the Gun" by Supreme Beings of Leisure
 "Martenot Waves" by Meat Beat Manifesto
 "Ren 2" by Photek
 "Hands Around My Throat" by Death in Vegas
 "Beauty Never Fades (Animatrix Edit)" by Junkie XL featuring Saffron
 "Supermoves (Animatrix Remix)" by Overseer
 "Conga Fury (Animatrix Mix)" by Juno Reactor
 "Red Pill, Blue Pill" by Junkie XL & Don Davis
 "The Real" by Tech Itch & Don Davis

Additional music 
The following tracks were also used in the movie, although not appearing on the album:
 "Masters of the Universe" by Juno Reactor
 "Virus" by Satoshi Tomiie
 "Suzuki" by Tosca
 "Dark Moody" by Junkie XL

References 

The Matrix (franchise) albums
2003 soundtrack albums
Anime soundtracks
Warner Records soundtracks